Mersey Forest is a locality in the local government areas of Meander Valley and Kentish in the North West region of Tasmania.
The 2016 census determined a population of zero for the state suburb of Mersey Forest.

History
The Mersey River is believed to have been named in 1826 after the River Mersey in England. It is assumed that the locality was named for the river.

Geography
The Mersey River passes through the centre of the locality from south to north. The Rowallan Power Station and its associated Rowallan Dam and Lake Rowallan are on the river in the southern part. The majority of the locality consists of forest reserves, and it is adjoined on the west, south and east by national parks and conservation areas.

Road infrastructure
The C138 route (Mersey Forest Road) enters the locality from the north-east, before turning north-west and exiting as Oliver's Road. Mersey Forest Road continues south as Route C171 to Rowallan Dam. It then continues further south with no route number, providing access to the Walls of Jerusalem car park and beyond.

References

Localities of Meander Valley Council
Localities of Kentish Council